Lisa Dick (born 26 September 1968) is a former Australian long-distance runner. She won a silver medal in the marathon event at the 1998 Commonwealth Games in Kuala Lumpur.

References

1968 births
Living people
20th-century Australian women
21st-century Australian women
21st-century Australian people
Athletes (track and field) at the 1998 Commonwealth Games
Australian female long-distance runners
Commonwealth Games silver medallists for Australia
Sportswomen from Victoria (Australia)
Commonwealth Games medallists in athletics
Medallists at the 1998 Commonwealth Games